Psychedelic Horseshit is an American band from Columbus, Ohio, that plays a microgenre of lo-fi noise pop that they named "shitgaze".

History
The group was founded by Matt Whitehurst in 2005; he claims the band's name was coined off-the-cuff by Sarah Asher when he and a few musician friends landed a slot playing a jam band festival. The group's lo-fi sound, recorded with inexpensive equipment, was solidified over the recording of several CD-R releases in 2006 and 2007. The group's first 7" arrived in 2007 on Columbus Discount, followed by an EP; Siltbreeze picked the band up for a full-length, Magic Flowers Droned, in 2007. In 2009 the group re-released some of the old CD-R material as Golden Oldies, along with new songs as Shitgaze Anthems.  Golden Oldies received a 5.2/10 rating on Pitchfork, and was called "tough to recommend", though Pitchfork says of Shitgaze Anthems, "never before have so many of their good ideas worked out quite so well." They also released the double seven-inch EP Too Many Hits as the final installment of the Columbus Discount Records Year One Singles Club in 2009.  In 2011 the group released the album Laced, which received a 7.3/10 rating on Pitchfork.  The album was called "more immediately enjoyable" than its prior releases.

Members
Matt Whitehurst – guitar, keyboards, vocals
Rich Johnston – percussion
Ryan Jewell – keyboards, percussion
David Radosevic – bass, guitar

Former
Jason Roxas – bass, keyboards
Justin Burkett – bass
Laura Bernazzoli - bass
Jesse Baker - bass
Andrew Graham - bass
Kevin DeBroux - bass
Ross Maddox - bass

Discography
Blown Speaker Standards (CD-R, 2006)
King Tubby's Badness Dub (CD-R, 2006)
"Who Let the Dogs Out?" (Columbus Discount Records, 2007)
New Wave Hippies EP (Half Machine Records) (2007)
Magic Flowers Droned (Siltbreeze, 2007)
Golden Oldies (LP, 2009)
Shitgaze Anthems (Woodsist Records, 2009)
"Magic Flowers Dubbed" (EP, 2009)
"Live At Pompeii" (EP, 2009)
Too Many Hits (2x7" Columbus Discount Records, 2009)
Acid Tape (Fan Death Records, 2010)
Laced (Fatcat Records, 2011)

References
Footnotes

Further reading
SXSW Live Review, About.com
SXSW Live Review, Washington Post
Live Review, Chicago Reader
Review, Isthmus

Indie rock musical groups from Ohio
Musical groups from Columbus, Ohio
Noise pop musical groups
Siltbreeze Records artists